LaDouphyous McCalla (born January 1, 1976) is a former American football defensive back who played six seasons with the Saskatchewan Roughriders of the Canadian Football League. He played college football at Rice University He signed with the Roughriders in May 2000.

References

External links
Just Sports Stats
College stats

Living people
1976 births
Players of American football from Texas
American football defensive backs
Canadian football defensive backs
American players of Canadian football
Rice Owls football players
Saskatchewan Roughriders players
Sportspeople from Tyler, Texas